Insurance in the United Kingdom, particularly long-term insurance, is divided into different categories.  The categorisation is currently set out in sections 333B, and 431B to 431F of the Income and Corporation Taxes Act 1988 (ICTA) with each category of business given a different tax treatment. The Chartered Insurance Institute is a prominent professional group first chartered in 1913 The Financial Services Authority was formed in 2001 as the regulator. In 2013 the Financial Services Authority was dissolved and financial regulation was instead placed with the Financial Conduct Authority and Prudential Regulation Authority.

Controversies 
In 2005, regulation of payment protection insurance was cited as a priority by UK's financial regulator; this scandal partially motivated the reorganization in regulatory agencies which occurred in 2013.

Categorisation

Life and non-life

The first basic categorisation of long-term insurance is between life and non-life business. Life insurance business is insurance that is contingent on human life. Examples would include a policy that pays out £100,000 if the policy holder dies within a specified time; a policy that pays out £100,000 in 10 years time, but will pay out £101,000 if the policy holder dies before the policy matures; a pension in payment, which will end once the pensioner dies.

The main example of non-lifelong-term insurance business is permanent health insurance, but the category includes pensions management. Capital redemption business, which is business written for a premium in exchange for a payment of an annuity over a period of, say, 99 years, is also long-term non-life business. However, for taxation purposes, only capital redemption business written before 1 January 1938 is treated as non-life assurance business.

Basic life assurance and general annuity business
Basic life assurance and general annuity business is defined as being life assurance business not fitting within any other category of business under section 431F ICTA. It is often abbreviated to BLAGAB. BLAGAB is taxed on the so-called "I minus E basis" (i.e. the company is taxed on its investment return minus its expenses of management). The I minus E basis raises the UK Exchequer more revenue than it would get if it were taxed on a trading basis. This is because a trading computation would tax Premiums plus Investment return minus Expenses minus Claims, and the expectation is that policy holder claims will be greater than the premiums they pay, as policy holders tend to hold life assurance policies as an investment that they hope will grow. To ensure the Exchequer does not lose out in a year where a trading basis would yield greater tax revenues, E (expenses of management) is restricted so the I minus E cannot be lower than the measure of trading profits, with any restricted E being carried forward and deemed to be E of the subsequent period.

Before 1 January 1992, there were separate tax computations for basic life assurance business and for general annuity business, since then the two categories have been combined into BLAGAB.

Capital redemption business written since 31 December 1937 has been treated as though it were BLAGAB from the first accounting period of a company ending on or after 1 July 1999. Before then, it was treated as a separate business taxed on an I minus E basis.

Pension business
The concept of pension business, in section 431B ICTA, was introduced in the Finance Act 1956, which was introduced as a tax-advantaged way of saving for retirement.  The tax advantage comes through taxing it on a trading profit basis rather than on an I minus E basis.  The precise definition of what it constitutes is closely defined by statute so that only schemes approved by the Government qualify for the tax advantages.  Pension business includes business relating both to the accrual of pension benefits whilst the policy holder is working and pensions in payment. Pension business includes reinsurance of pension business.

Background to Pensions:
Lifetime allowance: There is a limit on the value of retirement benefits that one can draw from the approved pension schemes before tax penalties apply.  That limit is called the lifetime allowance.

Introduced at A-day an individual is allowed to take benefits from their Pension up to the Lifetime allowance limit.  Any Benefits taken that exceed this Lifetime allowance will be subject to a tax charge.

A-DAY (26 April 2006): The changes were intended to make pensions less rigid and easier to understand, in a bid to encourage individuals to take control of their own pension Provision and to rationalise the British tax system as applied to pension schemes

See also
 Insurance in the United States
 Insurance in Australia

References 

 
Insurance law
Law of the United Kingdom
Corporate taxation in the United Kingdom